Quasi-solid, Falsely-solid, or semisolid is the physical term for something whose state lies between a solid and a liquid. While similar to solids in some respects, such as having the ability to support their own weight and hold their shapes, a quasi-solid also shares some properties of liquids, such as conforming in shape to something applying pressure to it and the ability to flow under pressure. The words quasi-solid, semisolid, and semiliquid may be used interchangeably.

Quasi-solids and semisolids are sometimes described as amorphous because at the microscopic scale they have a disordered structure unlike the more common crystalline solids. They should not be confused with amorphous solids as they are not solids and exhibit properties such as flow which bulk solids do not.

Examples
	
Petroleum jelly - a mixture of hydrocarbons extracted from crude oil and subsequently refined, has semisolid properties. It is used topically on human skin to promote healing of minor irritation or burns. It is also used to help heal chapped or sunburned lips. 

Other examples are gel, guacamole, salsa, mayonnaise, whipping cream, peanut butter, jelly, jam, toothpaste, and hand sanitizer.

See also
 Plasticity (physics)
 Viscosity

References

Phases of matter